
This is a list of bridges documented by the Historic American Engineering Record in the US state of California.

Bridges

See also
List of tunnels documented by the Historic American Engineering Record in California

Notes

References

List
List
California
Bridges, HAER
Bridges, HAER